The men's 100 metre butterfly event at the 2016 Summer Olympics took place on 11–12 August at the Olympic Aquatics Stadium.

Summary
Michael Phelps fell short of his attempt to fulfill an Olympic four-peat in the sprint butterfly event, due to a brilliant performance of Joseph Schooling, who became Singapore's first ever Olympic gold medalist. The Singapore National Olympic Council awarded Schooling S$1 million (about US$740,000) under the Multi-Million Dollar Award Programme (MAP). Singapore's unique "rewards for sports excellence" were the world's largest Olympic cash prize. Leading from the start, Schooling defeated the field of experienced sprinters, including all-time medal leader and his personal hero Phelps, to establish a new Olympic record of 50.39 for a gold-medal triumph. Schooling did not only erase Phelps' eight-year-old record by 0.19 seconds, but also produced the fastest time of the event in textile.

Three-quarters of a second later, Phelps touched the wall at the same moment as two of his rivals Chad le Clos of South Africa and four-time Olympian László Cseh of Hungary, leaving them with a matching 51.14 in a historic three-way tie for the silver. Despite missing out an Olympic title defense, Phelps continued to extend his Olympic résumé with a twenty-seventh career medal.

Separated by the leader of the field by almost a second, Chinese swimmer and 2014 Youth Olympic champion Li Zhuhao picked up the fifth spot with a junior world record of 51.26. Meanwhile, France's Mehdy Metella (51.58), Phelps' teammate Tom Shields (51.73), and Russia's Aleksandr Sadovnikov (51.84) closed out the championship field.

Notable swimmers failed to reach the top eight roster, featuring Schooling's countryman Quah Zheng Wen; London 2012 finalists Steffen Deibler (Germany), Joeri Verlinden (Netherlands), and Konrad Czerniak (Poland); Canada's Santo Condorelli, who produced a surprising top 16 finish from an unseeded prelims heat; and Papua New Guinea's Ryan Pini, who missed another chance to reproduce a top eight feat from Beijing 2008 in his fourth Olympic appearance.

Records 
Prior to this competition, the existing world and Olympic records were:

The following records were established during the competition:

Competition format

The competition consisted of three rounds: heats, semifinals, and a final. The swimmers with the best 16 times in the heats advanced to the semifinals. The swimmers with the best 8 times in the semifinals advanced to the final. Swim-offs were used as necessary to break ties for advancement to the next round.

Results

Heats

Semifinals

Semifinal 1

Semifinal 2

Final

References

Men's 00100 metre butterfly
Olympics
Men's events at the 2016 Summer Olympics